Yueyang Sanhe Airport  is an airport in the city of Yueyang in Hunan Province, China. Its construction was approved by the State Council of China and the Central Military Commission on 31 July 2013. The airport opened on December 26, 2018.

Facilities
The airport has a 2,600-meter runway (class 4C) and a 6,000-square-meter terminal building. It is projected to handle 600,000 passengers and 1,800 tons of cargo annually by 2020.

Airlines and destinations

See also
List of airports in China
List of the busiest airports in China

References

Airports in Hunan
Yueyang
Airports established in 2018
2018 establishments in China